Soko-Ban is a video game published in the United States by Spectrum HoloByte in 1988, based on the 1982 Japanese videogame Sokoban.

Development
In 1988, Sokoban was published in US by Spectrum HoloByte for the Commodore 64, DOS and Apple II as Soko-Ban. A version for the BBC Micro called Robol was published by a third party in 1993.

Sokoban was a hit in Japan, and had sold over 400,000 units in that country by the time Spectrum HoloByte imported it to the United States.

Gameplay
This version of the game includes 50 levels.

Reception
A 1988 review in Computer Gaming World praised the game for being "pure and simple, very playable and mentally challenging", citing its addictive qualities.

It was also reviewed in 1988 in Dragon #132 by Hartley, Patricia, and Kirk Lesser in "The Role of Computers" column. The reviewers gave the game 4½ out of 5 stars.

Brian Wierda for Compute! said "Soko-Ban may not be suited to the gung-ho action-adventure gamer, but if you're a puzzle solver, it's one of the best challenges you can find."

Paul Statt for InCider said "once I got the tricks down – not just strategic tricks, but tactics such as using the arrow keys instead of the joystick – Soko-Ban became, if not easy, mindless. It simulates this type of work well – unfortunately, that's pretty weak praise for a game."

Reviews
Happy Computer - Dec, 1987
The Games Machine - Apr, 1988
ACE (Advanced Computer Entertainment) - May, 1988

References

External links
Review in Info

Apple II games
BBC Micro and Acorn Electron games
Commodore 64 games
DOS games
Spectrum HoloByte games
TRS-80 Color Computer games